Terengganu Football Club II is a professional football club based in Kuala Terengganu, Terengganu, Malaysia. The club currently plays in the Malaysia Premier League, the second division of the Malaysian League.

The club was founded as T-Team on 14 July 2006, changed its name to Terengganu II in 2017 and become the reserve team of Terengganu Football Club. The club is widely known as The Turtles.

History

Early years (as T-Team)
The club was founded on 14 July 2006 as T-Team. The club was formed after Football Association of Kuala Terengganu District decided to send a football team to compete in Malaysian League as T-Team. They competed in 2008 Malaysia FAM League and achieved promotion to Malaysia Premier League for 2009 season. The club was then also promoted to Malaysia Super League after just one season in second division and then competed in 2010 Malaysia Super League. The club was further rebranded as T-Team Titans to gather local support.

The team quickly gained popularity among the local football fans as everyone's favourite underdog. As the team kept surpassing the pundits' and supporters' expectations season after season they also showed that they were more than capable of competing and beating Malaysia's heavyweights (JDT, Pahang and Kedah) even with their tight budget and often young squad.

Merging with Terengganu FA to become Terengganu FC
On 21 November 2017, T-Team management announced the club had been absorbed into Terengganu F.C., and the team status was changed to a reserve team of the newly restructured first team of Terengganu. As part of the change, T-Team changed its name to Terengganu II, and were automatically relegated to the 2018 Malaysia Premier League, despite finishing the season outside of the 2017 Malaysia Super League relegation zone.

This was a controversial decision among Terengganu and Malaysia football fans as they felt that the decision was very unfair towards the club and the players of T-Team (currently Terengganu F.C II) at that time. As the club worked hard until the last day of the season to avoid relegation to the Malaysia Premier League but still ended up getting relegated due to the decision of the board. The fans felt that there was no need for the two clubs to merge as they would have preferred T-Team to exist as their club and management and be able to watch a Terengganu Derby in the Malaysia Super League between Terengganu F.C. versus T-Team. Coach Rahmad Darmawan openly criticized the decision of the Terengganu F.C. board as he felt that he and his players were betrayed. He stated that had the decision of merging the two clubs been announced before the start of the season, he and his players would not have wasted their time and energy to avoid relegation. He then resigned as the coach of Terengganu F.C. II with the reason that he was not interested in managing a reserve side.

Under new head coach, Mustafa Kamal, Terengganu II performed badly in the league, and finished 11th, in the automatic relegation to Malaysia FAM League zone. As a result of the poor performance, Mustafa Kamal resigned as head coach, and the head coach role were temporarily held by Tengku Hazman, his assistant, for the inaugural Malaysia Challenge Cup. Tengku Hazman succeeded in leading his charges to win the tournament, beating UKM F.C. 4-2 on aggregate in the final.

In December 2018, Terengganu II were granted a reprieve by Malaysia Football League and retained their place for the 2019 Malaysia Premier League, after 2018 Malaysia FAM Cup champions Terengganu City F.C. were denied promotion due to unpaid player and staff wages issues.

Stadium

The club currently use the Sultan Ismail Nasiruddin Shah Stadium, Kuala Terengganu, Terengganu, Malaysia as their home venue. 

The capacity of the stadium is 25,000.

Ownership and finances

Sponsorship

Head coaches

Team managers

Club personnel

Honours

Domestic Competitions

League

 Malaysia FAM League
 Winners (1): 2008
 Malaysia Premier League
 Runners-up (1): 2009

Cups

 Malaysia Challenge Cup
 Winners (1): 2018

Preseason  Competitions

 Shah Alam City Cup
 Winners (1): 2021

 Terengganu Chief Minister's Cup 
 Winners (1): 2022

Club record

P = Played
W = Games won
D = Games drawn
L = Games lost
F = Goals for
A = Goals against
GD = Goal difference
Pts = Points
Pos = Final position

N/A = No answer
QR1 = First Qualifying Round
QR2 = Second Qualifying Round
QR3 = Third Qualifying Round
QR4 = Fourth Qualifying Round
RInt = Intermediate Round
R1 = Round 1
R2 = Round 2
R3 = Round 3

R4 = Round 4
R5 = Round 5
R6 = Round 6
GR = Group Stage
QF = Quarter-finals
SF = Semi-finals
RU = Runners-up
S = Shared
W = Winners

Affiliate clubs
 Terengganu
 Hanelang
 Terengganu City

References

External links
 Terengganu II Soccerway

 
Malaysia Super League clubs
Football clubs in Malaysia
2006 establishments in Malaysia
Malaysian reserve football teams
Association football clubs established in 2006